Squillante is a surname. Notable people with the surname include:

 James Squillante (1919 – 1960), American New York mobster
 Mauro Squillante, Italian plucked-instruments researcher and mandolinist
 Maurizio Squillante, Italian composer
 Rick Squillante (1948 – 2001), nightclub disc jockey and music industry representative and record producer